Schörg is a surname. Notable people with the surname include:

Gretl Schörg (1914–2006), Austrian operatic soprano
Regina Schörg (born 1969), Austrian operatic soprano